The French-speaking International University for African Development or Senghor University (in French: Université Senghor d'Alexandrie) is a private university in Alexandria, established by decree of the President of the Arab Republic of Egypt No. 272 ​​in May 1989 under an agreement between the Organisation internationale de la Francophonie and the Egyptian government, it officially opened in October 1990. The university was established to serve development issues In the continent of Africa, and plays a role in training African cadres entrusted with the advancement of the various countries of the continent. It is named after the writer and former Senegalese President Leopold Senghor. Its current headquarters is located in Mansheya Square in Alexandria, with ten other branches in Africa and Europe, on establishing its permanent headquarters in New Borg El Arab city, the university grants a master's degree in development in the fields of health, environment, culture, administration, education and administration. The university follows the European Bologna system which is approved by the European Union. The university currently receives about 200 students annually, and the number of The university's graduates since its inception are 2043 students.

History
The idea of ​​establishing an International Francophone University dates back to the early seventies when the former Agency for Cultural and Technical Cooperation - the International Organization of Francophonie now - decided to conduct a preliminary study for the establishment of the Association of French Universities. and protecting African values. In May 1989, a summit conference of heads of state and government of French-speaking countries was held in Dakar, capital of Senegal, during which the project to establish the Francophone University for African Development was presented. Or "Senghor University" in reference to one of the promoters of Francophonie, the former Senegalese president, Leopold Senghor, and that its headquarters should be in Egypt. After that, the agreement to establish the university was signed between the International Organization of Francophones and the Egyptian government, and in the same month, the President of the Arab Republic of Egypt Decision No. 272 was issued For the year 1989 by establishing the university and choosing Alexandria as its headquarters.

In October 1990, the university was officially inaugurated, and Albert Lordi was appointed president of the university, and studies began in only two departments: administration and health, then the environmental department was opened in 1991, then the department of culture in 1993, and global risk and crisis management in 2000, and the university has been receiving since Its establishment of only 50 students annually, until 2003 when the number of students received by the university increased to 100 students, then to 150 students in 2009, then 200 students annually in 2013, and on June 21,2016, Terry Vardal was appointed president and then director of the university, and in Later, Hani Helal was appointed president of the university, and on December 3, 2021 the foundation stone was laid for the new and permanent headquarters of the university New Borg El Arab city in Alexandria governorate on an area of 10 acres in the central axis area, and the new headquarters will consist of the academic building and its future expansions, buildings for housing students and faculty, buildings for sports activities, the library, as well as the building designated for the university administration.

Objectives
Senghor University was established to achieve several goals, the most important of which are:
 Restore the basic unity of science on the one hand, the dialogue of cultures on the one hand, and the protection of African originality and values.
 Contribute to serving sustainable development issues in the African continent.
 Training African cadres in the areas of sustainable urban mobility and the blue economy.
 Integrating the goal of sustainable development in the areas of culture, Ecology, management, and health.
 Design and disseminate public policies on peace and security in Africa and raise awareness of equality between women and men.

See also

 African French
 French University of Egypt

References

External links

Education in Alexandria
Universities in Egypt
Organisation internationale de la Francophonie
New Borg El Arab